Widgey R. Newman (1900–1944) was a British screenwriter, producer and film director. He was a major force in the British B film industry of the 1930s, overseeing the production of a number of quota quickies.

Selected filmography
 A Reckless Gamble (1928)
 Little Waitress (1932)
 Heroes of the Mine (1932)
 Lucky Blaze (1933)
 The Unholy Quest (1934)
 Immortal Gentleman (1935)
 On Velvet (1938)
 Men Without Honour (1939)
 Two Smart Men  (1940)
 Henry Steps Out (1940)

References

Bibliography
 Chibnall, Steve. Quota Quickies: The British of the British 'B' Film. British Film Institute, 2007.

External links

1900 births
1944 deaths
British film directors
British film producers
People from Bedford
20th-century British screenwriters